The 2022 Rugby Europe Sevens Conference's are the third and fourth divisions of Rugby Europe's 2022 sevens season. Conference 1 was held in Belgrade, Serbia on 4–5 June 2022, while Conference 2 was held in Paola, Malta on 11–12 June 2022.

Participating nations 
Conference 1

 
 
 

 
 
 

 
 
 

 
 
 

Conference 2

Conference 1

Group stage 

All times in Central European Summer Time (UTC+02:00)

Pool A

Pool B

Pool C

Knockout stage

Cup

5–8th Place

9–12th Place

Standings

Conference 2

Group stage 
All times in Central European Summer Time (UTC+02:00)

External links 
 Conference 1 page
 Conference 2 page

References 

2022 rugby sevens competitions
2022 in Serbian sport
June 2022 sports events in Serbia